This is a list of notable events in music that took place in the year 1992.

Specific locations
1992 in British music
1992 in Norwegian music

Specific genres
1992 in country music
1992 in heavy metal music
1992 in hip hop music
1992 in Latin music
1992 in jazz

Events

January–February
 January 11
 Nirvana's Nevermind album goes to No. 1 in the US Billboard 200 chart, establishing the widespread popularity of the Grunge movement of the 1990s.
 Paul Simon is the first major artist to tour South Africa after the end of the United Nations cultural boycott.
 January 16 – Mick Jagger attends the Hollywood première of his new movie, Freejack, at Mann's Chinese Theatre.
 January 25 – The inaugural Big Day Out festival takes place in Sydney, Australia, headlined by Violent Femmes and Nirvana.
 February 5 – New Kids on the Block interrupt their tour to perform on The Arsenio Hall Show in response to rumors that the group lip-synchs its concerts.
 February 16 – Slavic music is featured at the Oulu Music Festival, with concerts and opera productions in Oulu, Finland, until February 26.
 February 18 – Vince Neil leaves Mötley Crüe after 11 years as the band's lead singer, to spend more time on his career as a racing car driver.
 February 24
 Nirvana's Kurt Cobain marries Hole's Courtney Love.
 The U.S. Postal Service unveils two potential designs for its proposed Elvis Presley postage stamp for fans to vote on. One design is of a young, 1950s Elvis, and the other is of a much older, 1970s Elvis. The young Elvis wins the vote, and the stamp is issued the following January.
 February 25 
 Six major record companies reach an agreement to phase out the longbox form of compact disc packaging by April 1993, due to complaints that the packaging is environmentally wasteful.
 The 34th Annual Grammy Awards are presented in New York, hosted by Whoopi Goldberg. Natalie Cole's Unforgettable… with Love wins Album of the Year, while her "virtual duet" cover of "Unforgettable" with her late father, Nat King Cole, wins both Record of the Year and Song of the Year. Marc Cohn wins Best New Artist.

March–April
 March 10 – At the 1992 Soul Train Music Awards, Prince wins the "Heritage" award for lifetime achievement.
 March 14 – Farm Aid Five takes place in Irving, Texas, USA, hosted by Willie Nelson. Artists performing at the event include John Mellencamp, Neil Young and Paul Simon. Approximately 40,000 people attend the event.
March 16 – Mariah Carey performs at MTV Unplugged, shows critics her 5-octave range, and gets rave reviews.
 March 24 – A judge in Chicago, Illinois, USA, approves cash rebates of up to US$3 to anyone proving they bought Milli-Vanilli recordings prior to the beginning of the lip synching scandal on November 27, 1990.
 April 1 – Billy Idol, on trial for punching a woman in the face, pleads no contest. Idol is fined and ordered to make public service announcements against alcohol and drug abuse.
 April 20 – The Freddie Mercury Tribute Concert takes place at Wembley Stadium in London, England. All proceeds go to AIDS research.
 April 24 – David Bowie marries fashion model Iman.
 April 30 – In Los Angeles, California, USA, Madonna's bustier is stolen from a display in Frederick's of Hollywood. A US$1,000 reward is offered for its return.

May–June
 May 6
 The first Europäisches Jugendchorfestival,(EJCF) (European Festival of Youth Choirs) is held in Basel, Switzerland. Organizers decide to make it a triennial event.
 Rob Halford announces he is leaving Judas Priest.
 Selena releases her album Entre A Mi Mundo which contains her first No. 1 hit, "Como La Flor".
 May 7 – John Frusciante of the Red Hot Chili Peppers leaves the band prior to the publication of a Rolling Stone magazine cover featuring them; he has to be digitally edited out of the photo. Frusciante returned to the Red Hot Chili Peppers in 1998.
 May 9 – The 1992 Eurovision Song Contest, held at Malmö Isstadion in Malmö, Sweden, is won by Ireland's Linda Martin with the song "Why Me?", notably written by 1980 and 1987 winner Johnny Logan. At 41 years old, Martin becomes, and remains, the oldest woman to win the contest.
 May 11 – A. R. Rahman's debut film Roja is released. The soundtrack is regarded as a milestone that changed the face of Tamil film music and subsequently contemporary Indian music. Time magazine's film critic, Richard Corliss, stated in 2005 that the "astonishing debut work parades Rahman's gift for alchemizing outside influences until they are totally Tamil, totally Rahman," naming it one of the magazine's "10 Best Soundtracks" of all time.
 June 5 – The Sata Häme Accordion Festival takes place until June 14 in Ikaalinen, Finland.
 June 27
 Michael Jackson starts the Dangerous World Tour, supporting his Dangerous album in Munich, Germany.
 Guitarist Stefanie Sargent of up-and-coming punk rock band 7 Year Bitch dies of asphyxiation after returning home from a party in which she had drunk alcohol and taken a small amount of heroin. She was 24.
 June 29 – The Northern Accordion Festival takes place in Tornio-Haaparanta, Finland, until July 5.

July–August
 July 4 
The BudaFest Summer Opera and Ballet Festival is launched in Budapest, Hungary.
Mark Heard suffers a heart attack while performing at the Cornerstone Festival in Illinois, USA. Heard goes to hospital immediately after finishing his set, but dies two weeks after being discharged in August.
 July 10 – Seinäjoki (Finland) Tango Festival begins, running to July 12.
 July 11 – "November Rain" by Guns N' Roses enters the world record books when it becomes the longest single, at 8 minutes, 57 seconds, to reach the US Top 20. The single's video has a budget of over US$1.5 million, becoming the most expensive at the time.
 July 12 – Opening of the Chamber-Music Festival of Kuhmo, Finland (until July 26).
 July 18 – Whitney Houston marries Bobby Brown.
 July 28 – Ice-T announces that the controversial track "Cop Killer" is being pulled from Body Count's self-titled album.
 August 2
 Rozalla becomes the first artist from Zimbabwe to chart on the US Billboard magazine chart.
 Former Beatle George Harrison tells Billboard magazine that he recently discovered that he was born on February 24, and not February 25 as he had thought for most of his life.
 Haitian military authorities ban the playing of RAM's single "Fèy"; first performed at the Port-au-Prince Carnival in February, the song was widely interpreted as an anthem of support for exiled President Jean-Bertrand Aristide.
 American pop-punk band Blink-182 form in the suburbs of San Diego, but are known as Blink until 1995.
 August 3 – Lahti Organ Festival (Finland) begins, lasting until August 9.
 August 5 – Jeff Porcaro, arguably the most highly regarded studio drummer in rock from the mid-'70s to the early '90s, dies aged 38 of a heart attack.
 August 8 – During the Guns N' Roses/Metallica Stadium Tour, Metallica frontman James Hetfield is burned by a pyrotechnics blast during a concert at Montreal's Olympic Stadium, forcing the group to cancel the second hour of the show. Co-headliners Guns N' Roses take the stage, but walk off early with Axl Rose complaining of throat problems. The abbreviated show causes angry fans to riot in the streets of Montreal. The tour resumed on August 25, but with a guitar technician replacing Hetfield on guitar for the remainder of the tour. 
 August 14 – Opening of the Sibelius-Festival in Loviisa, Finland.
 August 18 – Frances Bean Cobain, daughter of Kurt Cobain and Courtney Love, is born. 
 August 20 – Opening of the Helsinki Festival, with the theme: Music of the Baltics (orchestral and chamber-music concerts, opera productions, song recitals, ballet, theater, jazz, pop, and rock concerts) until September 6.

September–October
 September 17 – Frank Zappa, in his final professional public appearance, conducts the Ensemble Modern at the Frankfurt Festival in Germany. Zappa, who is seriously ill with prostate cancer, receives a 20-minute ovation.
 October 3 – Sinéad O'Connor stirs up controversy when she rips up a picture of the Pope on the US television show, Saturday Night Live.
 October 16 – A massive Bob Dylan tribute concert is held at Madison Square Garden in New York. John Cougar Mellencamp, Neil Young, Eric Clapton, June Carter Cash, Johnny Cash and Tracy Chapman are among the many performers, but much attention becomes focused on Sinéad O'Connor, who is loudly booed by much of the audience in response to the Saturday Night Live incident two weeks earlier.
 October 20 – Singer-songwriter Madonna releases her fifth studio album, Erotica, which became one of her most controversial albums to date due to overtly sexual content.
 October 31 
"End of the Road" by Boyz II Men posts a 12th consecutive week at No. 1 in the US charts, ending a 36-year record previously held by Elvis Presley. Boyz II Men's record was broken on March 6, 1993, by Whitney Houston's "I Will Always Love You".
McTeague, an opera based on the Progressive Era-novel by Frank Norris, premieres at the Lyric Opera of Chicago.

November–December
 November 3 – The heavy metal and Rap rock band Rage Against the Machine releases their debut album.
 November 9 – Australian-born singer Kylie Minogue ends her working relationship with UK songwriters and record producers Stock Aitken Waterman and the record label PWL.
 November 15
 Megan Jasper of Sub Pop creates the grunge speak hoax, tricking The New York Times into printing an article on supposed slang used in the grunge scene in Seattle, USA.
 Ozzy Osbourne plays the final concert of his "retirement" tour at the Pacific Amphitheatre in Costa Mesa, California. He is joined on stage by his three former Black Sabbath bandmates for a reunion performance. Black Sabbath opened the show with Rob Halford as lead vocalist, filling in for Ronnie James Dio who had left the band days earlier.
 The Jacksons: An American Dream, a two-part miniseries based on the Jackson family, premieres on ABC.
 November 17 – The soundtrack album of "The Bodyguard", Whitney Houston's debut film, is released. The album went on to be certified 18 times platinum by the RIAA and sell 45 million copies worldwide. To date the album is still the best selling soundtrack of all time and also one of the best selling albums of all time.
 November 22 – Manchester-based post-punk and electronic music label Factory Records declares bankruptcy. The label had been placed in dire financial straits following the spending of most of their funds by Happy Mondays during the recording of their album Yes Please!, which would end up a commercial failure. Additionally, plans for a buyout from London Records folded when it was discovered that none of Factory's artists were actually signed onto the label; most of these artists, most notably New Order, would end up signing onto London Records anyhow following Factory's foreclosure.
 December 3 – Bill Wyman announces he is quitting The Rolling Stones.
 December 31
 Dietrich Fischer-Dieskau announces his retirement from the stage to an audience at the Bavarian State Opera in Munich.
 The twenty-first annual New Year's Rockin' Eve special airs on ABC, with appearances by TLC, Bell Biv DeVoe, Slaughter, Jon Secada, Village People and Barry Manilow.

Also in 1992
 David Isberg quits Opeth from his vocalist position. Current guitarist Mikael Åkerfeldt fills his position.
 Vibe, a new magazine focusing on R&B and hip-hop music, launches with a special Fall preview issue.
 The MP3 file format is developed as part of a video compression standard.

Bands formed
 See Musical groups established in 1992

Bands disbanded
 See Musical groups disestablished in 1992

Bands reformed
 The Tubes
 April Wine
 Madness

Albums released

January–March

April–June

July–September

October–December

Release date unknown

 Adam 'n' Eve - Gavin Friday
 Alice in Wonderland No. 4 - Randy Greif
 An Evening With The Allman Brothers Band, First Set – Allman Brothers Band
 Backstreet Of Desire - Willy de Ville
 Battle Cries - The Brave
 Black Ticket Day – Ed Kuepper
 Brer Rabbit and Boss Lion - Dr. John
 Center Of The Universe – Giant Sand
 Crooked Line - Nils Lofgren
 Destination Paradise – Fischer-Z
 Fireboy - Grant McLennan
 Goin' Back to Dixie - John Hartford
 Good Times - Chris Cacavas & The Junkyard Love
 Groovus Maximus – Electric Boys
 I, Jonathan - Jonathan Richman
 Infamous Angel - Iris Dement
 In Search of Manny - Luscious Jackson

 Letters To A Dream - Louis Tillett
 Little Village - Little Village
 Lysol – Melvins
 Mercy - Bryan Duncan
 Not Fade Away - Nitty Gritty Dirt Band
 Ramblin‘ Jeffrey Lee & Cypress Grove with Willie Love – Ramblin‘ Jeffrey Lee & Cypress Grove with Willie Love
 Scenic Routes – Lost Dogs
 Shhh – Chumbawamba
 Short Man’s Room - Joe Henry
 Six-Pack of Love - Peter Case
 Tales of Wonder - White Heart
 This Is Not The Way Home - The Cruel Sea
 Through the Forest – Mad at the World
 Too Much Fun - Green On Red
 Turns Into Stone - Stone Roses

Biggest hit singles
The following songs achieved the highest chart positions in the charts of 1992.

Top 40 Chart hit singles

Other Chart hit singles

Notable singles

Other Notable singles

Top ten best albums of the year
All albums have been named albums of the year for their hits in the charts.

 R.E.M. – Automatic for the People
 Rage Against the Machine – Rage Against the Machine
 Pavement – Slanted & Enchanted
 Alice in Chains – Dirt
 Tori Amos – Little Earthquakes
 Dr. Dre – The Chronic
 Faith No More – Angel Dust
 Sublime – 40 Oz. To Freedom
 Sonic Youth – Dirty
 Beastie Boys – Check Your Head

Classical music
 Torstein Aagaard-Nilsen – Arctic Landscape for Military Band
 Milton Babbitt
 Septet, but Equal
 Counterparts for brass quintet
 Leonardo Balada
 Symphony No. 4 Lausanne
 Celebracio for orchestra
 Mario Davidovsky – Synchronisms No. 10 for guitar and electronic sounds
 Lorenzo Ferrero
 La ruta de Cortés (symphonic poem)
 Movimento americano
Poi andro in America
 Peter Gahn – Auch ohne Sprache, for guitar
 Philip Glass – Symphony No. 1 Low
 Vagn Holmboe – Svaerm for string quartet (partially arranged from earlier violin duos)
 Elena Kats-Chernin – Clocks
 Ka Nin Chan – Saxophone Quartet
 Andreas Kunstein
 String Quartet No. 1
 10 Epigrams for Toy Piano
 Witold Lutosławski – Symphony No. 4
 James MacMillan – Veni, Veni, Emmanuel (concerto for percussion and orchestra)
 William Mathias – Flute Concerto
 Younghi Pagh-Paan – U-MUL
 Krzysztof Penderecki – Symphony No. 5 Korean
 Alwynne Pritchard – Glimpsed Most Clearly from the Corner of Your Eye, for seven cellos
 Roger Reynolds – Kokoro, for solo violin
 David Sawer – Byrnan Wood
 Kurt Schwertsik
 Uluru, Op. 64 for orchestra 
 Baumgesänge, Op. 65 for orchestra 
 Drei späte Liebeslieder, Op. 66 for cello and piano
 Human Existence, for voice and chamber ensemble
 John Serry Sr. – The Lord's Prayer, for organ & chorus
 Karlheinz Stockhausen – Signale zur Invasion, for trombone and electronic music, or unaccompanied trombone
 Joan Tower – Violin Concerto
 Malcolm Williamson – Requiem for a Tribe Brother
 Iannis Xenakis – La Déesse Athéna (Oresteïa III) (1992), for baritone solo and mixed ensemble of 11 instruments

Opera
 Antonio Braga – 1492 epopea lirica d'America
 Karel Goeyvaerts – Aquarius
 Ingvar Lidholm – Ett drömspel
 Jukka Linkola – Elina

Jazz

Musical theater

 Crazy for You – Broadway production opened at the Shubert Theatre and ran for 1622 performances
 Falsettos – Broadway production opened at the John Golden Theatre and ran for 487 performances 
 Guys and Dolls – Broadway revival
 Jelly's Last Jam – Broadway production opened at the Virginia Theatre and ran for 569 performances
 The Most Happy Fella – Broadway revival

Musical films
 Aladdin – Animated feature film by Walt Disney Animation Studios
 Deep Blues: A Musical Pilgrimage to the Crossroads
 Celibidache – You Don't Do Anything, You Just Let It Evolve (documentary by Jan Schmidt-Garre)
 Chnam Oun 16
 Khiladi
 The Muppet Christmas Carol
 
 Pure Country
 Roja – Tamil Indian film by Mani Ratnam
 Un cœur en hiver, featuring music by Maurice Ravel

Soundtracks
 Aladdin Academy Award winner for Best Song and Best Film Score
 Batman Returns – score Danny Elfman
 The Bodyguard – Whitney Houston
 Boomerang – Boyz II Men, Tribe Called Quest, P.M. Dawn, Babyface
 Bram Stoker's Dracula
 Coneheads – Paul Simon, R.E.M., Red Hot Chili Peppers
 Cool World – David Bowie, The Cult, Ministry, Moby, Brian Eno
 Deep Cover – Dr. Dre & Snoop Dogg
 Far and Away – score by John Williams
 Juice – Naughty by Nature, Too Short, EPMD, Cypress Hill
 The Last of the Mohicans – score by Trevor Jones and Randy Edelman
 Lethal Weapon 3 – Eric Clapton, Sting
 Malcolm X – Arrested Development (group), Billie Holiday, Ella Fitzgerald, Ray Charles
 Mambo Kings – Los Lobos, Linda Ronstadt, Tito Puente
 Medicine Man – score by Jerry Goldsmith
 Mo' Money – Color Me Badd, Public Enemy, Bell Biv DeVoe, Janet Jackson
 Rush – Eric Clapton
 Singles – Alice in Chains, Pearl Jam, The Smashing Pumpkins, Jimi Hendrix, Soundgarden
 Sister Act – Etta James, Whoopi Goldberg, C+C Music Factory
 South Central – Scarface, Cameo (band), Boo-Yaa T.R.I.B.E.
 Toys – Tori Amos, Enya, Frankie Goes to Hollywood
 Wayne's World – Queen, Jimi Hendrix, Red Hot Chili Peppers, Alice Cooper, Black Sabbath

Births
 January 2 – Alden Richards, Filipino actor, model and singer
 January 7 – Børns, American singer and songwriter
 January 12 - Jaguar Jonze, Taiwanese Australian independent musician, singer songwriter, multi - instrumentalist and activist
 January 16 – Maja Keuc, Slovenian singer
 January 19 – Mac Miller, American rapper, singer, record producer, musician (d. 2018)
 January 20 – Maria Harfanti, Indonesian social activist, pianist, and beauty pageant titleholder 
January 21 – Emma Birdsall, Australian singer-songwriter, contestant on The Voice Australia
 January 23 – Jordan "Rizzle" Stephens of Rizzle Kicks, sometimes works under names: Wildhood and Al, the Native.
 January 28 – Simone Egeriis, Danish singer
 January 31 – Christopher Nissen, Danish singer
 February 3 – Milo, American rapper and producer
February 7 – Jain (singer),  French musician and singer-songwriter. 
 February 9 – Avan Jogia, Canadian actor and singer
February 14 – Elley Duhé, American singer-songwriter
February 17 – Marika Hackman, English vocalist, multi-instrumentalist and songwriter.
February 23 – Tabitha Nauser, Singaporean pop and r&b singer and musician
 March 6 – Sarah De Bono, Australian singer-songwriter, contestant on The Voice Australia
 March 7 – Im Hyun-sik (singer), South Korean singer-songwriter
 March 10 – Emily Osment, American actress and singer
 March 17 - Ozuna, Latin singer
 March 14 – Jasmine Murray, American singer
 Kash Doll, American rapper
 April 3 – Young M.A., American rapper
 April 4 – Christina Metaxa, Cypriot singer-songwriter
April 10 - Stella Donnelly,  Australian indie rock singer-songwriter. 
 April 11 – Naya, Lebanese singer
 April 16 – Ronnie Flex, Dutch rapper
April 18 – Chloe Bennet, Chinese American singer, actress and activist
 April 22 – Dyro, Dutch DJ, producer and musician
April 23 
 Syd (singer), American singer, songwriter, record producer, disc jockey, and audio engineer
 Zelim Bakaev, Chechen singer
April 26 – Jon Cozart, American musician and comedian (Dodie, Malinda Kathleen Reese, Thomas Sanders)
 April 27 – Allison Iraheta, American singer
May 8- Chelcee Grimes, British singer-songwriter and footballer
May 6
 Baekhyun , Korean singer (EXO, SuperM)
 Vanesa Gabriela Leiro, Argentine actress and singer
May 10 – Jake Zyrus (formerly Charice Pempengco), Filipino singer
1992 – Malcolm David Kelley, American rapper and actor
May 19 
 Sam Smith (singer), English singer-songwriter
 Moses Sumney, Ghanaian-American singer
 Marshmello, American electronic dance music producer and DJ. (Anne-Marie, Selena Gomez)
May 21 – Chloe Angelides, American singer, songwriter and producer
 May 23 – Jinny Ng, Hong Kong Cantopop singer
 June 4 - Nothing,Nowhere, American rapper, singer and sognwriter
 June 14 – Princess Nokia, American rapper of Afro-Puerto Rican and Taíno descent
 June 20 – Sage the Gemini, American rapper (The HBK Gang)
 June 21 – Max Schneider, American singer-songwriter and actor
June 25 – Dorian Electra, American singer-songwriter, musician, video and visual artist
 June 26
 Melanie Amaro, American singer
 Jennette McCurdy, American (Former actress)  singer-songwriter, author, film maker and podcaster
 June 30 – Lynx and Lamb Gaede
July 1 – Caleb Nott, New Zealand musician, producer and songwriter (Broods) 
 July 2 – William Singe, Australian rapper, singer-songwriter and youtuber
 July 3
 Maasa Sudo, Japanese singer
 Nathalia Ramos, Spanish actress and singer
 July 5
Daisuke Sakuma, Japanese singer (Snow Man) 
Mirna Radulović, Serbian singer-songwriter
 July 8 – Sky Ferreira, American singer, songwriter, model, and actress
July 10
Angel Haze, American rapper, activist and singer-songwriter
Clara Luciani, French Singer 
 Harloe, American singer and songwriter 
 July 11 – Karise Eden,  Australian singer and activist
 July 13 – Rich the Kid, American rapper
 July 14 – Brytiago, Puerto Rican singer and songwriter
July 18 – Bishop Briggs, British singer-songwriter and musician 
July 19 – Ellie Rowsell, English singer-songwriter and musician (lead vocalist and guitarist of the indie rock band Wolf Alice).
 July 22 – Selena Gomez, American actress, television producer, advocate, businesswoman and singer-songwriter  (Taylor Swift, Britney Spears, Selena Gomez & the Scene, Julia Michaels, Demi Lovato) 
July 27 – Tory Lanez,  Canadian rapper, songwriter, producer
 August 2 – Charli XCX, British singer-songwriter, advocate, record executive, businesswoman, music video director and musician
 August 4
 S-X, British singer
 Tiffany Evans, American singer
 August 12 – Cara Delevingne, British singer/musician/actor/writer
 August 18 – Frances Bean Cobain, American artist, model, creator, activist, daughter of Kurt Cobain and Courtney Love
 August 19 - Feid, Colombian singer
 August 20 – Demi Lovato, American singer-songwriter, actor, advocate, philanthropist, entrepreneur, author and businessperson
 August 25 
 Emily Warren, American singer/songwriter, producer
 Kaytranada, Haitian-Canadian DJ and record producer
 August 27 
 Kim Petras, German singer-songwriter
 Blake Jenner, American actor & singer
 August 29 – Mallu Magalhães, Brazilian singer, songwriter and musician
September 2 
 Madilyn Bailey, American singer and songwriter.
 Rae Morris, British singer and songwriter
 September 9 - Leah Kate, American singer-songwriter 
 September 11 – Desireé Bassett, American guitarist and recording artist
 September 12 – Shigga Shay, Singaporean rapper
 September 15 – Camélia Jordana, French singer
 September 16 – Nick Jonas, member of the American band Jonas Brothers, solo artist, songwriter, singer, musician, actor (Miley Cyrus, Priyanka Chopra)
September 17 - Blxst, American rapper
September 18 – Joji (musician),  Japanese (Australian) singer, songwriter, rapper, record producer, former Internet personality and comedian
September 25 - Teddy Swims, American singer-songwriter 
 October 5 
 Rupi Kaur, Canadian-Punjabi poet and performer
 Mercedes Lambre, Argentine actress, singer, dancer, and model
 October 10 – Gabrielle Aplin, English singer and songwriter
 October 7 – Grace Bawden,  Australian independent classical crossover singer,
October 11 – Cardi B, American rapper/singer/songwriter
October 19 – Lewis Watson (musician),  English singer-songwriter. (Dodie Clark) 
October 22 
 Carrie Hope Fletcher, English singer-songwriter, actress, author (friend of Emma Blackery)
 21 Savage, Rapper and songwriter
October 24 - Leroy Clampitt, formerly known as Big Taste, is a producer, singer-songwriter and multi-instrumentalist from Pirongia, New Zealand, based in Los Angeles, California. (Worked with: Madison Beer, Sabrina Carpenter, Broods, Ashe, Carlie Hanson) 
October 26 – Lido (musician),  Norwegian record producer, singer, and songwriter, frequent collaborator with Halsey
 October 30 – Greeicy Rendón, Colombian actress and singer
November 3 - Jamie McDell, alt-country award-winning guitarist and singer-songwriter from Auckland, New Zealand.
November 5 – Ming Bridges, Australian Singaporean singer-songwriter, actress and model
 November 12 – Giulietta, Australian singer-songwriter and dancer
 Erika Costell, American singer-songwriter and musician
November 19 – Tove Styrke, Swedish singer-songwriter
 November 21 
 Conor Maynard, British singer
 Davido, Nigerian singer
 November 23 – Miley Cyrus, American singer-songwriter, actress, performer and activist (formerly lead character on Disney musical comedy: Hannah Montana, worked with and supported Britney Spears)
 November 26 - Anuel AA, Latin singer
 November 27 – Chanyeol, Korean rapper, singer-songwriter and record producer (EXO)
 December 4 – Jin, South Korean singer-songwriter and member of BTS
 December 8
Katie Stevens, American singer
Yui Yokoyama, Japanese singer and actress  
 December 9 – Maelyn Jarmon, American musician, winner of The Voice, Team John Legend
 December 12 – Austin Jones, American singer and youtuber
 December 14 – Tori Kelly, American musician, singer and songwriter
 December 18 – Bridgit Mendler, American actress and singer
 December 26 – Jade Thirlwall, English singer-songwriter, dancer and member of Little Mix, activist, businesswoman
 December 28 – Gordi (musician),  Australian folktronica singer/songwriter

Deaths
 January 14 – Jerry Nolan, drummer for The New York Dolls, 45
 January 15 – Dee Murray, bassist for Elton John, 45 (cancer)
 January 17 – Charlie Ventura, tenor saxophonist and bandleader, 75
 January 23 – Marie-Thérèse Gauley, French opera singer prominent at the Opéra-Comique, 88
 January 27 – Allan Jones, singer and actor, 84
 January 29 – Willie Dixon, blues singer-songwriter and musician, 76
 February 12 – Stella Roman, operatic soprano, 87
 February 21 – Jane Pickens Langley of the Pickens Sisters
 March 4 – Mary Osborne, jazz guitarist, 70 (liver cancer)
March 8 – Champ Butler, American singer, 65
 March 10 – Giorgos Zampetas, Greek composer, 67
 March 20 – Georges Delerue, composer, 66
 March 21 – Shaik Dawood Khan, tabla virtuoso, 75
 March 27 – Harald Sæverud, composer, 95
 April 4 – Arthur Russell, cellist and disco musician, 40 (AIDS)
 April 20 – Johnny Shines, guitarist, 76
 April 25 – Yutaka Ozaki, Japanese singer, 26 (pulmonary edema)
 April 27 – Olivier Messiaen, composer, 83
 April 30 – Toivo Kärki, composer, arranger and producer, 76
 May 7 – Tiny Timbrell, guitarist, 75
 May 12 – Sylvia Syms, American singer, 74
 May 17 – Lawrence Welk, accordion player and bandleader, 89
 May 23 – Joyce Barker, operatic soprano, 60
 June 3 – Ettore Campogalliani, music teacher and composer, 89
 June 8 – Alfred Uhl, composer, 83
 June 18 – Peter Allen, Australian songwriter, 48 (AIDS)
 June 20 – Sir Charles Groves, conductor, 77
 July 4 – Ástor Piazzolla, tango musician and composer, 71
 July 5 – Paul Hackman, Canadian musician, 38 (car accident)
 July 21 – Aloys Fleischmann, composer and musicologist, 82
 July 25 – Alfred Drake, US singer and actor, 77
 July 26 – Mary Wells, Motown singer, 49 (laryngeal cancer)
 July 29 – William Mathias, composer, 57
 August 2 – Michel Berger, French composer and songwriter, 44 (heart attack)
 August 5 – Jeff Porcaro, drummer, Toto, 38 (heart attack)
 August 12 – John Cage, U.S. composer, 79
 August 16 – Mark Heard, U.S. singer, 40 (heart attack)
 September 19 – Sir Geraint Evans, operatic baritone, 70
 October 3 – Peter Klein, lyric tenor, 85
 October 5 – Eddie Kendricks, singer, (The Temptations) 52 (lung cancer)
 October 7 – Harold Truscott, composer, pianist, broadcaster and writer on music, 78
 October 25 – Roger Miller, singer, 56 (lung cancer)
 November 10 – Hilda Hölzl, operatic soprano, 65
 November 13 – Ronnie Bond (The Troggs), 52
 November 14 – Teddy Riley, New Orleans jazz trumpeter and bandleader
 November 21 – Severino Gazzelloni, flautist
 November 23 – Roy Acuff, "King of Country Music", fiddler, 89
 November 27 – Daniel Santos, singer and composer of bolero
 November 29 – Paul Ryan, singer, songwriter and record producer, 44 (cancer)
 December 9 – Cesar Gonzmart, violinist, 72
 December 10 – Kate Buchdahl, violinist, 28 (Hodgkin's lymphoma)
 December 15 – Otto Lington, composer, orchestra leader and violinist, 89
 December 21
 Philip Farkas, horn player, 78
 Albert King, blues guitarist and singer, 69
 Nathan Milstein, violinist, 88
 December 26 – Nikita Magaloff, pianist, 80

Awards
 Country Music Hall of Fame Inductees: George Jones and Frances Preston
 1992 Country Music Association Awards
 Eurovision Song Contest 1992
 Filmfare Best Male Playback Award: Awarded to Kumar Sanu
 34th Annual Grammy Awards
 34th Japan Record Awards
 Mercury Music Prize: Awarded to Primal Scream for Screamadelica
 Ramon Magsaysay Award: Awarded to Ravi Shankar
 1992 RTHK Top 10 Gold Songs Awards: First prize awarded to "暗戀你" sung by Jacky Cheung
 Rock and Roll Hall of Fame inductees: Bobby Blue Bland, Booker T. and the M.G.s, Johnny Cash, The Isley Brothers, The Jimi Hendrix Experience, Sam & Dave, and The Yardbirds

See also
 1992 in British music
 List of Hot 100 number-one singles of 1992 (U.S.)
 Record labels established in 1992

References

 
20th century in music
Music by year